Shiva Temple of Stone is an ancient temple and archeological site located in Mymensingh district of Bangladesh. Raja Jagat Kishore Acharya, the then zamindar of Atani in Muktagachha built the temple with the help of architect Moyez Uddin. It is the temple set up by the zamindars in front of the Armed Police Battalion Camp in Muktagachha town of Muktagachha upazila of Mymensingh district. The distance from Muktagachha Upazila to the temple is 18 kilometers.

History 
In 1826, with the grace of Nawab Murshid Quli Khan, Muktagacha became habitable and started zamindari. Later, 16 landlord lived here. For this, the place is known as '16 Hissar Zamindar' meaning in English 'region of 16 landlord'. One of those 16 zamindars was Raja Jagat Kishore Acharya, the zamindar of Atani. He built a stone Shiva temple in 183 with the famous architect Moyez Uddin of Patna, India. Jagat Kishore gave a lot of gifts to Acharya Moyez Uddin for the construction of this temple.

Descriptions 
The temple is built of stone. There are various designs on the walls, herbaceous work on the dome and beautiful arch work.

See also 
 List of archaeological sites in Bangladesh

References 

Temples in Bangladesh
Archaeological sites in Mymensingh district
Durga temples
Shiva temples
Hindu temples in Mymensingh District